TechWadi is a non-profit organization based in the Silicon Valley of California. It focuses on promoting links between business interests in the MENA region and the United States in areas such as the information technology industry through providing resources such as financial capital. It also organises related events such as conventions and hackathons.

References

Non-profit organizations based in California